A wedding cake is a cake served at a wedding reception.

Wedding Cake may also refer to:

In architecture
 Wedding-cake style, buildings with many tiers giving the appearance of a wedding cake  
 Wedding Cake House (Kennebunk, Maine), a much-photographed house
 Eastern Channel Pile Light and Western Channel Pile Light, lighthouses in Sydney Harbour
 Monument to Vittorio Emanuele II in Rome
 Amex House, American Express's European HQ in Brighton, England
 No. 1 Croydon, an office block in Croydon, south London

In other
 Wedding Cake Island off Sydney, Australia
 Amazing Wedding Cakes, a US TV series on cake decorating
 "Wedding Cake Island", a song on the Bird Noises album
 Mount Taipingot in the Mariana Islands